Daniel B. Ryan Jr. (1894 – April 8, 1961) was an American businessman, lawyer, and politician who served as a member of the Cook County Board of Commissioners from 1923 to 1926 and again from 1930 until his death in 1961. He was a Democrat. The Dan Ryan Expressway is named in his honor.

Early life and education
He was born in 1894. His father, Daniel Ryan Sr., was a Chicago politician who eventually rose to become President of the Cook County Board of Commissioners. The Daniel Ryan Woods, a forest preserve on the South Side is named after the elder Ryan.

Ryan attended the De La Salle Institute and earned a law degree from Kent College of Law. Ryan also served in the United States Navy during World War I.

Career 
Dan Ryan Sr. died in 1923 and the board elected Ryan Jr. to fill the remainder of his father's term. From 1926 to 1930, he operated an insurance business before running for the commission in 1930. After his election, Ryan served on the Roads and Bridges Committee and later the Finance Committee. It was in his chairmanship of the Roads and Bridges Committee that he proposed building a superhighway across the city. He aspired to run for Mayor of Chicago as well as Governor of Illinois, however, neither post materialized in his career.

In 1954, he was elected as president of the county board, assuming his father's old position. As board president, he floated bond issuance to fund the construction of highways.

He won re-election in 1958 and planned to run for another term at the time of his death.

Ryan was a promoter of superhighways for the Chicago area, but financing was difficult before creation of the Interstate Highway System, and in 1955, Ryan engineered an ambitious bond issue program to jump-start construction of expressways in Cook County.

Personal life
He was married to Ruby H. O'Connor Ryan (1902–1998) and had one son, Daniel Ryan III. She succeeded him on the commission as board member and served until 1981. On April 8, 1961, Ryan died from a heart attack. Eighteen months after his death, in December 1962, the stretch of highway that he fought to build opened as the Dan Ryan Expressway. Ryan is buried in the family plot at Holy Sepulchre Cemetery alongside his father, mother and wife.

In 2018, Dan Ryan III criticized a proposal from Bill Daley, who was running for mayor, to rename the Dan Ryan Expressway after former President Barack Obama.

References

1894 births
1961 deaths
De La Salle Institute alumni
Presidents of the Cook County Board of Commissioners
20th-century American politicians
Illinois Democrats